Jonathan S. Berek, MD MMS is the Laurie Kraus Lacob Professor at the Stanford University School of Medicine, Director of the Stanford Women's Cancer Center, and Senior Advisor, Stanford Cancer Institute. He is a recent past Fellow in the Stanford Distinguished Careers Institute.

Professor Berek helped establish and is the Director of the Stanford Women’s Cancer Center, which is one of the first programs in the nation to combine breast & gynecologic oncology with a women’s cancer translational research, genetics and supportive services programs. He served as Chair of the Stanford Department of Obstetrics and Gynecology from 2005-2017.

In 2019, Dr. Berek launched the Stanford Center for Health Communication, a Center conducting research at the intersection of medicine and the media with a focus on the spread of health misinformation. The Center trains health care providers in the art and science of effective communication with patients, peers and the public.

A Stanford faculty member since 2005, he is renowned for his expertise in gynecologic oncology, surgical innovation and technique, and research in ovarian cancer, especially immunology and immunotherapy. His past laboratory research focused on fundamental mechanisms of cancer immunology, elucidating growth regulatory pathways for cytokines and their receptors. His current research focuses on clinical trials of novel therapies and immunotherapies for ovarian cancer and collaborations on new diagnostics, screening techniques, and genetics.

Dr. Berek is Group Chair and Principal Investigator of the Cooperative Oncologic Gynecology Investigators (COGI), and member of the Gynecologic Cancer InterGroup.

Professor Berek is Past President of the International Gynecologic Cancer Society and the Council of University Chairs in Obstetrics & Gynecology. He is a Fellow in American Society of Clinical Oncologists (FASCO), American College of Surgeons (FACS), Society of Pelvic Surgeons (FSPS), and American College of Obstetricians and Gynecologists (FACOG).

Dr. Berek was awarded the Lifetime Achievement Award by the American Cancer Society in 2019 for his  many contributions to women's cancer care and research.

Education 
Dr. Berek received his undergraduate degree in English literature and theatre arts, and a Master of Medical Sciences degree in biomedical sciences from Brown University. After earning his Doctor of Medicine from Johns Hopkins School of Medicine, he completed an internship and residency at the Harvard Medical School, Brigham and Women's Hospital. Before moving to Stanford, he was on the faculty at the David Geffen School of Medicine at UCLA for over two decades, where he served the Chair of the College of Applied Anatomy, Chief of Staff of the UCLA Medical Center, departmental Executive Vice Chair, and Director of Gynecologic Oncology.

Publications 
An author and editor, Dr. Berek has published more than 330 peer-reviewed manuscripts in the scientific literature, and an equal number of book chapters and monographs. His books, Berek & Hacker’s Gynecologic Oncology, now in its 7th edition, and Berek & Novak’s Gynecology, in its 16th edition, are leading texts in the field. He serves as Editor-in-Chief for Current Opinion in Obstetrics & Gynecology, and immediate past Editor-in-Chief of ASCO Connection.

Documentary Films 
In addition to his medical career, Dr. Berek is a documentary filmmaker creating and directing films on medical topics including cancer patients stories, obstetric emergencies, and mindset, as well as a film about the Stanford Distinguished Careers Institute.

Awards 
In 2003, Dr. Berek received the highly prestigious Sherman Mellinkoff Award from the David Geffen School of Medicine at UCLA. In 2012, he was presented the John C. Fremont Pathfinder Award, given in recognition of significant contributions to society made by a native Nebraskan. Dr. Berek is the 2019 Honoree of the American Cancer Society for a lifetime of achievement and his many accomplishments in women’s cancer treatment and research.

Philanthropy 
Dr. Berek founded the Under One Umbrella fundraising gala in 2009 to support the work of the Stanford Women's Cancer Center. The annual event brings in celebrities from film and music to raise funds for women's cancer research. In 2019, the gala raised $3.5 million. It has raised $52 million over the last decade

External links
 http://med.stanford.edu/profiles/Jonathan_Berek/

References

Living people
American obstetricians
Year of birth missing (living people)
Brown University alumni
Johns Hopkins School of Medicine alumni